Olivier Jacques Marie Certain de Germay de Cirfontaine (born 18 September 1960) is a French prelate of the Catholic Church who has been metropolitan archbishop of Lyon since December 2020. He served as bishop of Ajaccio from 2012–2020. Before taking up his clerical career, he served as a paratrooper in the French army.

Early life and career
Olivier de Germay was born on 18 September 1960 in Tours, France. He was the third of five children born to Christian de Germay, a general in the French army, and Claude Bullier. He studied at the Military Lyceum in La Flèche and the Special Military School of Saint-Cyr in Coëtquidan, earning an engineering diploma and the rank of captain. Beginning in 1986 he served five years as an army paratrooper based in Tarbes, taking part in missions in Chad, Central Africa and Iraq. He left the army with the rank of lieutenant. He later described a moment of insight he experienced while on duty in Africa:

Priesthood
He entered the seminary in 1991 and studied at the seminary in Paray-le-Monial for the first cycle, completing his second cycle at the Seminary and University of Pius XI and the Catholic University of Toulouse. Whilst living at the Pontifical French Seminary in Rome, he obtained a licentiate in moral theology from the John Paul II Institute of the Pontifical Lateran University. He was ordained a priest of the Archdiocese of Toulouse on 17 May 1998. He worked as vicar of Castanet-Tolosan and diocesan chaplain of the Guides of France from 1999 to 2001; pastor of the parish ensemble of Catenet  from 2001 to 2003; dean of the Banlieues-Sud area of Toulouse from 2003 to 2006; pastor of the parish ensemble of Beauzelle from 2006 to 2012; episcopal vicar for the suburb of Toulouse from 2004 to 2012; professor of sacramental and family theology at the Institut Catholique of Toulouse  from 2008 to 2012; and assistant of the Diocesan Service of Family Pastoral Care from 2010 to 2012.

Episcopacy

Bishop of Ajaccio

On 22 February 2012, Pope Benedict XVI appointed him Bishop of Ajaccio, despite de Germay never having visited Corsica. He received his episcopal consecration on the following 14 April. He was the second bishop to have been consecrated in Corsica in more than 200 years. As bishop, he chose to draw a priest's stipend. After an attack on an Islamic reading room in his diocese, where anti-Muslim sentiment is strong, he said:

The Bishops' Conference of France elected him as an alternate delegate to the 2015 Synod on the Family. On the Synod's consideration of access to the sacraments for those who are divorced and attempted remarriage, he underlined its insistence on accompaniment and individual histories, adding that "it was already being done but perhaps not enough: one can be divorced-remarried and have responsibilities in the Church." 

During the COVID-19 pandemic in 2020, he supported the government's restrictions on gatherings, but protested when its relaxation of its confinement policy ignored the recommendations of the French bishops in anticipation of the public celebrations of Pentecost. He warned the government not to "muzzle" the Church.

Metropolitan archbishop of Lyon
Pope Francis named him metropolitan archbishop of Lyon on 22 October 2020. He was installed there on 20 December 2020. He had not been mentioned as a candidate for Lyon and his appointment was unexpected.

As archbishop of Lyon, de Germay holds the title of Primate of the Gauls.

Given the cases of sexual abuse and his predecessor's trial and acquittal, de Germay said he was "arriving on tiptoe" in Lyon. Within the Bishops' Conference of France, he is a member of the Council for Movements and Associations of Faithful.

Views
De Germay is considered a conservative, and is outspoken on issues pertaining to marriage and sexuality. In an interview with Corse-Matin, when asked about the Church's opposition to condoms, he said that "[s]he has something more profound to tell young people about the beauty of sexuality than essentially hygienic discourse." Commenting on clerical celibacy, he remarked that his relationship to God as a cleric can be on the "same order as a loving relationship [marriage]" and offered an indirect defence of the Latin Church's practice of mandatory celibacy by mentioning the struggles married Eastern Church clergy had confided to him.

References

Additional sources

External links
 

Living people
1960 births
Clergy from Tours, France
Archbishops of Lyon
École Spéciale Militaire de Saint-Cyr alumni
Pontifical Lateran University alumni
21st-century Roman Catholic archbishops in France
Bishops of Ajaccio